Commute, commutation or commutative may refer to:

 Commuting, the process of travelling between a place of residence and a place of work

Mathematics
 Commutative property, a property of a mathematical operation whose result is insensitive to the order of its arguments
Equivariant map, a function whose composition with another function has the commutative property
Commutative diagram, a graphical description of commuting compositions of arrows in a mathematical category
Commutative semigroup, commutative monoid, abelian group, and commutative ring, algebraic structures with the commutative property
Commuting matrices, sets of matrices whose products do not depend on the order of multiplication
Commutator, a measure of the failure of two elements to be commutative in a group or ring

Science and technology
 Commutator (electric), a rotary switch on the shaft of an electric motor or generator
 Commutation (neurophysiology), how certain neural circuits in the brain exhibit noncommutativity
 Commutation (telemetry), a form of time-division multiplexing
 Commutation, a synonym for packet switching in computer networking and telecommunications

Other uses
 Commutation (law) (of sentence), a reduction in severity of punishment
 Commutation (finance) (law) to lessen periodic dues (usually rents, fares or tithes) by paying a lump sum
 Commutation (finance) under a cash option, encashment.  The act of a pension member/annuitant who gives up part or all in exchange for a lump sum payment.